Antipterna monostropha is a species of moth in the family Oecophoridae, first described by Edward Meyrick in 1885 as Ocystola monostropha. The lectotype for Ocystola monostropha was collected at Blackheath, New South Wales.

Occurrence data from GBIF shows A. monostropha occurring in Western Australia, South Australia, New South Wales, and Queensland.

Meyrick's description

Further reading

References

External links
Antipterna monostropha: images & occurrence data from GBIF

Oecophorinae
Taxa described in 1885
Taxa named by Edward Meyrick